Two human polls comprise the 1989–90 NCAA Division I women's basketball rankings, the AP Poll and the Coaches Poll, in addition to various publications' preseason polls. The AP poll is currently a poll of sportswriters, while the USA Today Coaches' Poll is a poll of college coaches. The AP conducts polls weekly through the end of the regular season and conference play, while the Coaches poll conducts a final, post-NCAA tournament poll as well. The poll produced a list of the top 20 teams from the inception through the 1988–89 season. In 1989–90, the change was made to produce a list of the top 25 teams.

Legend

AP Poll
Source

USA Today Coaches poll
Source

References

1989–90 NCAA Division I women's basketball season
College women's basketball rankings in the United States